The Casaluna is a small river in the department of Haute-Corse, Corsica, France.
It is a tributary of the Golo.

Course

It crosses the communes of Aiti, Cambia, Carticasi, Castineta, Érone, Gavignano, Lano, Morosaglia, Saliceto and San-Lorenzo.

The Casaluna rises to the west of the  Monte Muffraje in the commune of Carticasi.
It flows with many meanders in a generally northwest direction to its confluence with the Golo to the south of Ponte Leccia.
In its lower course it defines the eastern boundary of the Forêt de Pineto.

Bridge

On 24 November 2016 an exceptionally violent storm hit central Corsica and caused widespread flooding.
An ice jam on the Casaluna river washed away a centuries-old bridge that spanned it.
A temporary bridge was thrown over the river in mid-January 2017, but could not carry the heaviest vehicles.
In May 2020 work on a permanent replacement was scheduled to begin. 
Although some of the local people wanted the old bridge to be rebuilt, that would be vulnerable to a similar storm, which was expected to become increasingly common as the climate changed.
Instead a modern bridge was to be built in place of the old one.
On 23 July 2020 a public inquiry was launched prior to environmental authorization of the project.

Hydrology

The river's flow has been measured at Gavignano since 2013.

Tributaries
The following streams (ruisseaux) are tributaries of the Casaluna, ordered by length, and sub-tributaries:

 Prunitaccio 
 Gavignaninco 
 Paiarello 
 Uscio a e Porte 
 Casella 
 Senichello 
 Lago Maio 
 Castineta 
 Serena 
 Panicale 
 Mazzichelle 
 Venato 
 Padula 
 Campo di Melo 
 Aninco 
 Quercitello 
 Canale 
 Mangani 
 Guadella 
 Cerio 
 Sarbaio 
 Cotero 
 Calcinaju 
 Busincu 
 Vituste 
 Ombriato 
 Ponticello 
 Forci 
 Olivacce 
 Fossa Ceca 
 Funtana 
 Ripe Rosse 
 Scandulajola 
 Tenneri 
 Malerso 
 Vecchiale 
 Pindagliole 
 Pruenca 
 Mufrage 
 Turlone 
 Valdo

Notes

Sources

Rivers of Haute-Corse
Rivers of France